This is a list of the 550 Members of Parliament elected in the 1999 general election held in Turkey. The MPs are listed by province. Turkey uses a D'Hondt proportional representative system to elect Members of Parliament. These MPs formed the 21st Parliament of Turkey. An overview of the parliamentary composition is shown in the table below.

Adana

Adıyaman

Afyon

Ağrı

Aksaray

Amasya

Ankara

Antalya

Ardahan

Artvin

Aydın

Balıkesir

Bartın

Batman

Bayburt

Bilecik

Bingöl

Bitlis

Bolu

Burdur

Bursa

Çanakkale

Çankırı

Çorum

Denizli

Diyarbakır

Edirne

Elazığ

Erzincan

Erzurum

Eskişehir

Gaziantep

Giresun

Gümüşhane

Hakkari

Hatay

Iğdır

Isparta

İstanbul

İzmir

Kahramanmaraş

Karabük

Karaman

Kars

Kastamonu

Kayseri

Kırıkkale

Kırklareli

Kırşehir

Kilis

Kocaeli

Konya

Kütahya

Malatya

Manisa

Mardin

Mersin

Muğla

Muş

Nevşehir

Niğde

Ordu

Osmaniye

Rize

Sakarya

Samsun

Siirt

Sinop

Sivas

Şanlıurfa

Şırnak

Tekirdağ

Tokat

Trabzon

Tunceli

Uşak

Van

Yalova

Yozgat

Zonguldak 

Terms of the Grand National Assembly of Turkey
Political history of Turkey